The 1917 Tulane Olive and Blue football team was an American football team that represented Tulane University as a member of the Southern Intercollegiate Athletic Association (SIAA) during the 1917 college football season. In its third year under head coach Clark Shaughnessy, Tulane compiled a 5–3 record.

Schedule

References

Tulane
Tulane Green Wave football seasons
Tulane Olive and Blue football